Palani Amarnath (born 1 June 1982) is an Indian cricketer who played for the Chennai Super Kings in the Indian Premier League and for Tamil Nadu in the Ranji Trophy. He was born in Vellore.

Career 
Amarnath is a fast bowler. He made his debut in first-class cricket against Sri Lanka invitational XI and List A and  Twenty20 debuts against Goa.

External links
Profile at Cricinfo

Chennai Super Kings cricketers
Tamil Nadu cricketers
1982 births
Living people
Indian cricketers